The women's 5000 metres event will be held February 5. 7 athletes participated. The final was held from 15:05–15:39.

Schedule
All times are Almaty Time (UTC+06:00)

Records

Results

References

Women 5000 metres